Light Rail Depot is an MTR  stop. It is located at ground level at the junction of Lung Mun Road and Tuen Tsing Lane, near Tuen Mun Depot and Sun Tuen Mun Centre, in Tuen Mun District. It began service on 18 September 1988 and belongs to Zone 1.

History
This stop was originally named "Pak Kok" as it was located at a point called Pak Kok before Butterfly Bay was reclaimed. It was then renamed to "LRT Depot" in 1989 (LRT was the abbreviation of Light Rail Transit, the name for the Light Rail system until the early 1990s). On 13 June 2010, the stop was renamed Light Rail Depot stop, while the Chinese name remained unchanged.

References

MTR Light Rail stops
Former Kowloon–Canton Railway stations
Tuen Mun District
Railway stations in Hong Kong opened in 1988